P. Scott Lipps is the state representative for the 55th District of the Ohio House of Representatives. He is a Republican. The district consists of Franklin and Springboro as well as the eastern and southern townships of Warren County.

Life and career
Lipps was born in Miamisburg, Ohio, graduating from Miamisburg High School before attending the College of Wooster and DePaul University for his masters.

A small businessman, Lipps opened Sleep Tite Mattress Factory & Showr

oom, in Franklin, in 1990.  In 2000, Lipps was elected to the Franklin City Council, where he would serve for sixteen years, including two terms as Mayor of Franklin. He is also involved in a number of philanthropic and local organizations, including the Masons, Rotary and Chamber of Commerce.

Ohio House of Representatives
After serving in local office for over sixteen years, Lipps decided to seek an open seat in the Ohio House of Representatives in 2016.  The seat became vacant when Representative Ron Maag was term-limited after four terms.  However, he had a competitive Republican primary, winning by just 398 votes over Steve Muterspaw.

In a safely Republican district, Lipps won the 2016 general election over Democrat Samuel Ronan 79% to 21%.

In a safely Republican district, Lipps won the 2018 general election over Democrat Jim Stanton 74% to 26%

References

External links
Ohio State Representative Scott Lipps official site
campaign site

Living people
College of Wooster alumni
DePaul University alumni
Republican Party members of the Ohio House of Representatives
People from Miamisburg, Ohio
21st-century American politicians
Year of birth missing (living people)